Farmer "Lefty" Brady (August 29, 1893 – death date unknown) was an American baseball pitcher in the Negro leagues. He played with the Cleveland Tate Stars in 1921 and the Cleveland Browns in 1924.

References

External links
 and Baseball-Reference Black Baseball stats and Seamheads

Cleveland Tate Stars players
Cleveland Browns (baseball) players
1893 births
Year of death missing
Baseball players from Georgia (U.S. state)
Baseball pitchers